This list of fictional ungulates is a subsidiary to the list of fictional animals. The list is restricted to notable ungulate (hooved) characters from various works organized by medium. This paraphyletic list includes all fictional hooved characters except fictional horses, fictional pachyderms (elephants, hippopotamuses, and rhinoceroses), and fictional swine, as each has its own list.

Literature

Comics

Mythology

Media

Radio

Film

Television

Animation

Video games

Advertising mascots

Sports Team Mascots

Others
Patches, a giraffe stuffed toy in Suzy's Zoo

References

Lists of fictional animals by type